The following is a partial list of performance poets.

Africa

Nigeria
Eva Alordiah

South Africa
Phillippa Yaa de Villiers
Lebogang Mashile
Isabella Motadinyane
Lesego Rampolokeng

North America

Canada

Lillian Allen
Afua Cooper
Shane Koyczan
Brendan McLeod
Susan McMaster
Chris Tse
Mustafa the Poet
Dwayne Morgan
Leah Lakshmi Piepzna-Samarasinha
Sheri-D Wilson
Kaie Kellough
Boonaa Mohammed

United States
A-E

Taalam Acey
Alurista
David Antin
Craig Arnold
Robert Ashley
Amiri Baraka
John M. Bennett
Buddy Wakefield
Big Poppa E
Nicole Blackman
Brother Dash
Derrick Brown
B. Dolan
Roger Bonair-Agard
Giannina Braschi
Clint Catalyst
Richard Cambridge
Staceyann Chin
Jim Cohn
Allison Hedge Coke
Jamie DeWolf
Maggie Estep

F-J

Karen Finley
Shaggy Flores
Kip Fulbeck
Andrea Gibson
Allen Ginsberg
John Giorno
Jesse Glass
Gary Glazner
Guillermo Gómez-Peña
Roxy Gordon
Hedwig Gorski
John S. Hall
John Agard
Suheir Hammad
Matt Harvey
Bradley Hathaway
M. Ayodele Heath
Neil Hilborn
Jackie Hill-Perry
Bob Holman
Detrick Hughes
J. Ivy
David Jewell

K-P

Sarah Kay
Kealoha
Nomy Lamm
Erika Renee Land
The Last Poets
Al Letson
Lydia Lunch
Taylor Mali
Jeffrey McDaniel
Mighty Mike McGee
Karyna McGlynn
Douglas A. Martin
Kevin Max
Boonaa Mohammed
Lenelle Moïse
Anis Mojgani
José Montoya
Jessica Care Moore
Alix Olson
Robert Peters
Jason Petty
Lynne Procope

R-Z

John Rives
Ursula Rucker
Carl Hancock Rux
Michael Salinger
Bryan Lewis Saunders
Jill Scott
Gil Scott-Heron
Beau Sia
Otep Shamaya
Marc Smith
Patricia Smith
Patti Smith
Rod Smith
Sekou Sundiata
Taco Shop Poets
Quincy Troupe
George Watsky
Buddy Wakefield
Anne Waldman
Saul Williams

Europe

France
Léo Ferré

Italy
Massimo Volume
Offlaga Disco Pax

Germany
Kurt Schwitters

Ireland

Russia
Konstantyn K. Kuzminsky

Spain
Carlos Oroza
El Chojin

United Kingdom

Daniel Beaty
Attila the Stockbroker
Francesca Beard
Pete Brown
Craig Charles
Muslim Belal
Paula Claire
John Cooper Clarke
Jegsy Dodd
Matt Harvey
John Hegley
Adrian Henri
Michael Horovitz
Linton Kwesi Johnson
Anthony Joseph
Liverpool Poets
Roger McGough
Hollie McNish
The Medway Poets
Ted Milton
Andrew Motion
Brian Patten
Jeremy Reed
Lemn Sissay
Rod Summers
Jim Templeton
Nick Toczek
Rhys Trimble
Seething Wells
Gez Walsh
Luke Wright
Peter Wyton
Murray Lachlan Young
Benjamin Zephaniah
Scroobius Pip
Salena Godden
Kae Tempest
Byron Vincent
Alice McCullough

Australia

Jas H. Duke
Jayne Fenton Keane
Luka Lesson
Chris Mansell
Pi O
Les Wicks
Amanda Stewart
Billy Marshall Stoneking
Komninos Zervos
Max-Mo

New Zealand

Tusiata Avia
Miriam Barr
Ben Fagan
Sam Hunt
Craig Ireson
Michael Rudd
Apirana Taylor

Performance poets